Vilém König (18 September 1903 - 5 March 1973) was a Czech football manager and former player.

As a player, König played for FK Viktoria Žižkov, Slavia Prague, SK Libeň, Admira Vienna and Marseille. König played once for the Czechoslovakia national team.

After finishing his active career, König started to work as a football manager. He coached SK Kladno and Slavia Prague.

References

External links
Profile at ČMFS website 

1903 births
1973 deaths
Czech footballers
Czechoslovak footballers
Czechoslovak expatriate footballers
Czechoslovakia international footballers
FK Viktoria Žižkov players
SK Slavia Prague players
FC Admira Wacker Mödling players
Olympique de Marseille players
Ligue 1 players
Czech football managers
Czechoslovak football managers
SK Slavia Prague managers
SK Kladno managers
Association football midfielders
Expatriate footballers in Austria
Expatriate footballers in France
Czechoslovak expatriate sportspeople in Austria
Czechoslovak expatriate sportspeople in France
People from the Kingdom of Bohemia